Nierybno  is a settlement in the administrative district of Gmina Barlinek, within Myślibórz County, West Pomeranian Voivodeship, in northwestern Poland.

For the history of the region, see History of Pomerania.

References

Villages in Myślibórz County